Didymos may refer to:

 65803 Didymos, a near-Earth asteroid
 Didymos (music theorist), ancient Greek music theorist
 Several other ancient Greeks more commonly spelt Didymus; see Didymus (disambiguation)
 Didymos I (1921–2014), Oriental Orthodox bishop

See also 

 
 Didimus, a genus of beetles
 Didymo (Didymosphenia geminata), a species of diatom
 
 Didymus (disambiguation)